The canton of Fourmies is an administrative division of the Nord department, northern France. It was created at the French canton reorganisation which came into effect in March 2015. Its seat is in Fourmies.

It consists of the following communes:

Aibes
Anor
Avesnelles
Baives
Bas-Lieu
Beaurieux
Bérelles
Beugnies
Bousignies-sur-Roc
Cerfontaine
Choisies
Clairfayts
Colleret
Cousolre
Damousies
Dimechaux
Dimont
Eccles
Eppe-Sauvage
Felleries
Féron
Ferrière-la-Petite
Flaumont-Waudrechies
Fourmies
Glageon
Hestrud
Lez-Fontaine
Liessies
Moustier-en-Fagne
Obrechies
Ohain
Quiévelon
Rainsars
Ramousies
Recquignies
Rousies
Sains-du-Nord
Sars-Poteries
Sémeries
Solre-le-Château
Solrinnes
Trélon
Wallers-en-Fagne
Wattignies-la-Victoire
Wignehies
Willies

References

Cantons of Nord (French department)